Tavriyske is a village in Kherson Raion, Kherson Oblast, southern Ukraine, about  west-northwest from the centre of Kherson city. It belongs to the Bilozerka settlement hromada, one of the hromadas of Ukraine.

History 
The village came under attack by Russian forces in 2022, during the Russian invasion of Ukraine.

Demographics
The settlement had 566 inhabitants in 2001. The native language distribution as of the Ukrainian Census of 2001 was:
Ukrainian: 92.05%
Russian: 4.95%
Armenian: 1.41%
Moldovan (Romanian): 1.41%

References

Villages in Kherson Raion